Manuel Otero Aparicio (Madrid; 25 June 1942 - São Paulo, Brazil; 1 June 2011), known as Manolo Otero, was a Spanish singer, actor and director.

Musical career
Otero recorded a Spanish language version of When a Child is Born in 1973, with the Spanish title Todo el Tiempo del Mundo (All the Time in the World), which became a number one hit for 18 weeks from December 1974 to April 1975.

Film career
In 1967, Otero won the Grand Prix at the Annecy International Animation Film Festival for directing Arès contre Atlas. He co-directed other short films, including Patchwork and Rails.

Personal life
In 1973, Otero married actress María José Cantudo. They had one son, Manuel, and separated in 1978. Following a relationship with Argentine model and Miss Universe Silvana Suárez he married Colombian model Eddy Cano in 1986.

References

1942 births
2011 deaths